Stanley Walter St Pier (8 October 1904 – 1989) was an English footballer and scout.

Career
St Pier arrived at West Ham United from Ilford in April 1929 making his senior debut in October 1929 against Leicester City. Spending most of his time as understudy to Jim Barrett, St Pier managed only 24 appearances for The Hammers before retiring from playing in 1932. St Pier was appointed club chief scout by manager Charlie Paynter and was responsible for the discovery of John Lyall, Bobby Moore, Geoff Hurst, Martin Peters, Pat Holland, Frank Lampard, Paul Brush,  Alan Curbishley, Trevor Brooking and Mervyn Day amongst others, through his scouting network. Given a testimonial in May 1975, he retired in 1976 after 47 years service to West Ham.

Death

St Pier died in 1989.

References

Notes

Footballers from Ilford
West Ham United F.C. players
English Football League players
West Ham United F.C. non-playing staff
1904 births
1989 deaths
Association football defenders
English footballers
Ilford F.C. players
Association football scouts